Giant petrels form a genus, Macronectes, from the family Procellariidae, which consists of two living and one extinct species. They are the largest birds in this family. The living species are restricted to the Southern Hemisphere, and though their distributions overlap significantly, with both species breeding on the Prince Edward Islands, Crozet Islands, Kerguelen Islands, Macquarie Island, and South Georgia, many southern giant petrels nest farther south, with colonies as far south as Antarctica. Giant petrels are extremely aggressive predators and scavengers, inspiring another common name, the stinker. South Sea whalers used to call them gluttons. They are the only member of their family that is capable of walking on land.

Taxonomy
The genus Macronectes was introduced in 1905 by the American ornithologist Charles Wallace Richmond to accommodate what is now the southern giant petrel. It replaced the previous genus Ossifraga which was found to have been earlier applied to a different group of birds. The name Macronectes combines the Ancient Greek makros meaning "great" and nēktēs meaning "swimmer".

The present-day giant petrels are two large seabirds from the genus Macronectes. Long considered to be conspecific (they were not established as separate species until 1966), the two species, the southern giant petrel, M. giganteus, and northern giant petrel, M. halli, are considered with the two fulmars, Fulmarus, to form a distinct subgroup within the Procellariidae, and including the Antarctic petrel, Cape petrel, and snow petrel, they form a separate group from the rest of the family.

A fossil giant petrel, Macronectes tinae is known from the Pliocene epoch of New Zealand.

Description
They superficially resemble the albatross, and are the only procellarids that can equal them in size. They can be separated from the albatrosses by their bill; the two tube nostrils are joined together on the top of the bill, unlike on albatross, where they are separated and on the side of the bill. Giant petrels are also the only members of the family Procellariidae to have strong legs to walk on land. They are also much darker and more mottled brown (except for the white morph southern, which are whiter than any albatross) and have a more hunch-backed look. The bills of Procellariiformes are also unique in that they are split into between seven and nine horny plates. The petrels have a hooked bill called the maxillary unguis which can hold slippery prey. They produce a stomach oil made up of wax esters and triglycerides which is stored in the proventriculus. This can be sprayed out of their mouths as a defence against predators and as a protein-rich food source for chicks and for the adults during their long flights. Petrels have a salt gland situated above the nasal passage that helps to desalinate their bodies by excreting a high saline solution from their noses.

The two species are difficult to tell from each other, possessing similar long, pale, orange bills and uniform, mottled grey plumage (except for around 15% of southern petrels, which are almost completely white). The billtip of M. halli is reddish-pink and that of M. giganteus is pale green, appearing slightly darker and lighter than the rest of the bill, respectively. The underside of older M. halli birds is paler and more uniform than M. giganteus, the latter showing a contrast between paler head and neck and darker belly. Additionally, adults of M. halli typically appear pale-eyed, while adults of M. giganteus of the normal morph typically appear dark-eyed (occasionally flecked paler). Classic examples of northern giant are identifiable at some range. Young birds of both species are all dark and very hard to distinguish unless bill tip colour can be seen. Some relatively young northern giant petrels can appear to be paler on the head, suggesting southern giant, thus this species is harder to confirm.

The extinct Macronectes tinae is characterized by having smaller bodies than their living relatives.

Etymology
Macronectes comes from the Greek words makros meaning "long" and nēktēs meaning "swimmer".  Also, petrel is derived from St. Peter and the story of his walking on water, as they appear to run on the water when they take off.

Behaviour

Feeding

Petrels are highly opportunistic feeders. Unique among procellarids, they will feed both on land and at sea; in fact, they find most of their food near coastlines. On land, they feed on carrion, and regularly scavenge the breeding colonies of penguins and seals. They will display their dominance over carcasses with a "sealmaster posture": the head and the wings are held outstretched, the head pointing at the opponent and the wingtips pointing slightly back; the tail is raised to a vertical position. They are extremely aggressive and will  kill other seabirds (usually penguin chicks, sick or injured adult penguins and the chicks of other seabirds), even those as large as an albatross, which they kill either by battering them to death or drowning. At sea, they feed on krill, squid, and fish. They often follow fishing boats and other ships, in the hope of picking up offal and other waste.

Reproduction
The egg is incubated for about 60 days; once hatched the chick is brooded for three weeks. Chicks fledge after about four months, but do not achieve sexual maturity for six or seven years after fledging.

Conservation
While both species were listed as near threatened in the 2008 IUCN Red List, subsequent evidence suggested they were less threatened than previously believed, and the populations of both actually appeared to have increased, at least locally. Consequently, they were listed as least concern on the 2009 Red List and afterwards (as of IUCN's last assessment in 2018, they continue to be listed as least concern).

The southern giant petrel is listed as endangered on the Australian Environment Protection and Biodiversity Conservation Act 1999, while the northern giant petrel is listed on the same act as vulnerable. Their conservation status also varies from state to state within Australia.

Gallery

References

Sources
 
 
 del Hoyo, Josep, Elliott, Andrew & Sargatal, Jordi (1992). Handbook of Birds of the World Vol 1. Barcelona:Lynx Edicions,

External links
Southern and Northern Giant Petrels - Species text in The Atlas of Southern African Birds.
Video of George the Giant Petrel being released by New Zealand Department of Conservation

Macronectes
Taxa named by Charles Wallace Richmond